Rocks and Honey is the sixteenth studio album by Welsh singer Bonnie Tyler, first released by ZYX Music on 8 March 2013. Eight years since Wings was released in 2005, this was the longest gap between album releases in Tyler's career, and is the first of her studio albums to chart in the United Kingdom since Hide Your Heart in 1988. With tracks written by Nashville-based songwriters such as  Frank J. Myers, Desmond Child, Brett James and Beth Hart, the album consists of a number of country songs reminiscent to Tyler's country albums from the 1970s with elements of rock.

The album received generally positive reviews from music critics, who praised Tyler's vocals as well as the album's consistency. Rocks and Honey charted in Europe, reaching number 28 in Denmark, number 52 in the UK and number 59 in Germany and Switzerland. Tyler embarked on her South Africa Tour 2013 following the Eurovision Song Contest. The single "Believe in Me" represented the United Kingdom in the Eurovision Song Contest 2013 in Malmö, Sweden on 18 May 2013, and has charted in the UK Singles Chart at number 93. The album was named in reference to the contrast between the voices of Tyler and duet partner Vince Gill on the track "What You Need From Me". The follow-up singles, "This Is Gonna Hurt" and "Love Is the Knife", were released in August and September 2013 respectively.

Background

Plans for the release of Rocks and Honey date back to as early as 2008, where an interview with Tyler was published in a Turkish newspaper precessing a concert in Northern Cyprus. She announced that she would be working with Jim Steinman for her new album and was aiming for a release in summer 2009. Due to health reasons, Steinman did not end up working on the album. Then in September 2008, Tyler was interviewed on an internet radio show called The Bat Segundo Show, where she stated that she had recorded demos for several tracks and had approached Bryan Adams to do a duet for the album, but he said that it was "not the right time".

During a 2010 interview in New Zealand when preparing to perform at a charity concert, Tyler stated that she had recorded six tracks for the album, expecting a release at some point in 2011. In years leading up to the album's release, Tyler has performed new songs such as "You Are The One", "Don't Tell Me It's Over Now", "It's My Name", and "Is That Thing Loaded?". However, none of these songs were added to the album, despite Tyler announcing during various concerts that they had been recorded, or were due to be recorded for it. "Under One Sky" was also due to be released on the new album, but was instead released on Tyler's 2011 compilation album, Best of 3 CD. During an interview while promoting the album in the UK, she said that it was a possibility that "Is That Thing Loaded?" may be included on a future album.

On 22 February 2012, Desmond Child announced on his Twitter account that Tyler had been recording some of his songs in Nashville with David Huff as producer. An update about news of the new album was posted on Tyler's old website on 13 February 2012, where it was announced that Tyler had been recording in Nashville. News of a demo recording of "What You Need From Me" was added on 16 April 2012, where it also said that she had visited Los Angeles to help with the mixing of some tracks. Tyler made the title of the album public during an interview in Norway in July later that year.

Between the release of Rocks and Honey and Wings in 2005, Tyler had released a number of compilations including Best Of 3 CD with Stick Music, her previous record company. ZYX Music, the first record company to release Rocks and Honey, first signed Tyler in 2011 and released Live in Germany 1993, a CD and DVD.

Album title

"What You Need From Me" was written by Jon Randall and Jessi Alexander and a demo was played to Tyler when visiting a publishing company in Nashville in 2011. After hearing the song she approached Vince Gill to record the track as a duet. After recording the song, Tyler stated that someone compared her and Gill's voices to a combination of rocks and honey, which led Tyler to name the album "Rocks and Honey". American singer-songwriters Melissa Bollea and Bill DiLuigi wrote a song with the same title for Tyler, though she had already finalised the naming of the album and turned down the song.

Development
The majority of songs were recorded in various studios in Tennessee between February and May 2012. Tyler has already stated that she has enough remaining material from Nashville-based publishers for a seventeenth studio album.

Two songs were written by Desmond Child. This was the first time Tyler had worked with Child since 1988, on her Hide Your Heart album. All thirteen tracks were newly recorded by Tyler, with the inclusion of two covers; "Flat on the Floor" was originally recorded by Carrie Underwood on her 2007 album Carnival Ride, and "All I Ever Wanted" was first recorded by Beau Davidson in 2010.

While Tyler and her manager were living in Nashville, they visited the Bluebird Cafe on a songwriters' evening where she first discovered some tracks that would be included on Rocks and Honey.

Release and promotion
Tyler first announced the title of the album on BBC Radio Wales in August 2012. On the same show, "What You Need From Me" became the first track of the album to be played on radio internationally. The second track to be made public was "All I Ever Wanted", which Tyler performed live in Germany for a New Year's Eve show, and again in February, though the middle eight was cut.

Rocks and Honey was due to be released in October 2012, though after Tyler was asked to participate in the Eurovision Song Contest, the release was postponed for five months. The album was first made available for sale on the French Amazon store in February 2013. A promotional album artwork was later added before the official artwork was made public.

Singles

"Believe in Me" was announced to be the UK's Eurovision Song Contest entry on 7 March, and was released in the UK as a download single on 13 March and as a maxi CD on 15 March in Europe. The song received constant airplay on BBC Radio 2, who 'A-listed' the single on their music playlist. On 28 March 2013 they also listed the single as "record of the week". In an interview with Female First Magazine in April 2013, Tyler announced that it was likely that the track "Sunshine" will be a second single for the album. However it was later announced that "This Is Gonna Hurt" would be the second single, and was released in August 2013 on CD and digital download. On 16 September it was announced that "Love Is the Knife" would become the third single, released in Scandinavia as a digital download. She performed the song on the Danish TV show Charlies Hjertegalla.

Although Tyler herself did not release the song, "Mom" was later released as a single by Garth Brooks on his 2014 album Man Against Machine.

Touring
Tyler has expressed her wishes to tour with the new album in the UK and France. While promoting the album in France, she met with a tour company on 1 June 2013 to discuss a tour of France. In August 2013, Tyler began her South Africa Tour 2013, in which she performed at five concerts in three different South African cities.

Bonnie Tyler in the Eurovision Song Contest 2013

At mid-day, Tyler was interviewed and then performed an acoustic version of the song on BBC Radio 2's Weekend Wogan with her Eurovision group.

For further promotion, Tyler was a guest on The One Show on 19 March 2013 and was interviewed on several British radio stations leading up to the Grand Final. On 19 May, a day after the Eurovision Song Contest, the Official Charts Company announced that Tyler's song charted highest of all Eurovision entries in the UK.

After the contest finished, the BBC published the reaction of several journalists and singers towards Tyler finishing 19th. Irish entrant and three-time winner of Eurovision Johnny Logan complimented Tyler, but argued that the song wasn't strong enough. He continued, "If you're going to win Eurovision, to go through some of the incredible voting I've noticed over the last few years, you have to have something that's going to stand out above everything else. Otherwise you're just going to hope to pick up 10 or 11 votes." Similarly, Nathan Moore agreed that the song was not strong enough, but said "It was a great idea to get Bonnie involved, there's a lot of love for Bonnie out there." Mick Dalley (of Yahoo! News) agreed that "although Tyler herself was on form, singing beautifully and rousing the crowd with her podiumed finale, "Believe in Me" was simply not good enough as a song". 1997 UK winner Katrina Leskanich (of Katrina and the Waves) stated that she was underwhelmed by Denmark's entry, and expected Tyler to have scored higher than she did. British journalist Dave Goodman acknowledged that Tyler's entry was an improvement on the previous year, though argued that it was a combination of a poor position in the running order and the song that kept the UK from scoring higher.

Critical reception

Rocks and Honey has received mixed reviews from critics since its release. Dirk Neuhaus of Country Rock Magazine published a favourable review of the album, crediting David Huff and Matt Davis for the album production and called "What You Need From Me" a "fantastic track." Norbert Schiegel of G+J Entertainment Media highlighted the tracks "Sunshine" as a "pleasantly catchy" song, and "What You Need From Me" as "sensational." He described the whole album as "outstanding." Jeremy Williams of The Yorkshire Times gave the album a 5/5 rating. He asks, "has the gritty vocal of Bonnie Tyler still got what it takes to make you tingle? The simple answer is YES," and marks the album as an "impressive return to her country roots". He also questions that the track "Little Superstar" was not chosen for the UK's Eurovision song over "Believe in Me". Similarly, Music-News' Andy Snipper suggested that the track "Mom" would have been better suited as the Eurovision song, though describes Rocks and Honey as "a fine album."

The album received a mixed review from Adam Carroll from Seen It Heard It. He says that "This Is Gonna Hurt" provides a solid start to the album, with "Sunshine" being his favourite song, and though not keen on ballads, describes "Believe in Me" as a fantastic song. However, he considers "What You Need From Me" to be one of the weakest tracks on the album, describing Tyler's voice as "rough and beaten" and that her and Vince Gill's voices do not go together well. Despite this, he still describes the album as solid, and ends with "Bonnie Tyler proves that she is still one of the greatest vocalists out there." Virgin Media's Ian Gittins gave the album 3 stars. He stated that the album has nothing new to offer, and could have been recorded any time between 1978 and the present day. The most critical of the album has been Thomas Ingham from OMH Media, who gave the album 2 and a half stars, described the album's format as "simple – loud, quiet, loud, quiet" and is compiled of a mixture of "cheesy ballads" and "country pop-rock" songs, describing "Flat On The Floor" as "clichéd, but worryingly catchy." He ended with predicting that Tyler will not be able to take the UK out of its poor Eurovision results trend.

Track listing

Chart performance

Personnel
Credits adapted from Allmusic:

Musicians
Lead vocals – Bonnie Tyler
Guest vocals – Vince Gill (track 4)
Drums – Chad Cromwell
Bass – Jimmie Lee Sloas
Acoustic guitar / mandolin / dobro / banjo – Ilya Toshinsky
Electric guitars – Jerry McPherson, Tom Bukovac, Kenny Greenberg
Piano / B-3 / synthesizer – Mike Rojas
Strings – Larry Hall (track 2)
Backing vocals 
Bekka Bramlett (track 1, 7, 10 and 11)
Jodi Marr (track 1, 2, 3, 9 and 14)
James House (track 5 and 6)
Russell Terrell (track 8 and 12)
Bob Bailey (track 13)
Vicki Hampton (track 13)
Wendy Moten (track 13)
Derek Lee (track 13).
Choir – Tennessee Gospel Choir (track 13)

Production
Producer – David Huff
Executive producer & management – Matt Davis
Tracking engineer – Drew Bollman
Assistant engineers – Sorrel Brigman, Seth Morton
Additional second engineers – Chris Small, Chris Ashburn and Miles Suqua
Mastering – Adam Ayan

Photography
Cover photo – Sergei Arzumanyan
Page 2 and 6 – Katie Scott
Page 5 to 8 – Andrew Hopkins

Recording studios
Blackbird Studio, Nashville (Tennessee)
Ben's Studio, Nashville (Tennessee)
Star Struck Studio, Nashville (Tennessee)
Paragon Studio, Nashville (Tennessee)
Cane Cutting Studio, Miami (Florida)

Mixing
Eargasm Studio, Santa Monica (California)
Larabee Studio, North Hollywood (California)
Star Struck Studio, Nashville (Tennessee)

Mastering
Adam Ayan, Gateway Mastering, Portland (Maine)

Release history

References

2013 albums
Bonnie Tyler albums